Crudaria is an Afrotropical genus of butterflies in the family Lycaenidae.

Species
Crudaria capensis van Son, 1956
Crudaria leroma (Wallengren, 1857)
Crudaria wykehami Dickson, 1983

External links
Crudaria at Markku Savela's Lepidoptera and Some Other Life Forms

Aphnaeinae
Lycaenidae genera
Taxa named by Hans Daniel Johan Wallengren